Stuartpuram Police Station is a 1991 Telugu-language action film written and directed by Yandamuri Veerendranath. Produced by K. S. Rama Rao starring Chiranjeevi, Vijayashanti and Nirosha , with Sarath Kumar playing the lead antagonist.

Plot
Inspector Rana Pratap (Chiranjeevi) is assigned to Stuartpuram police station. Stuartpuram in Andhra Pradesh, is a notorious place devastated by colonial prejudice, burglaries, robbery, and political corruption. Rana Pratap is assigned to the shelved mystery of large scale Jewel robbery in the village. Rana Pratap fights against this mafia and is on a mission to apprehend Mafia leader (Sarath Kumar) who is the mastermind  behind the Jewel robbery.

Cast
 Chiranjeevi as Rana Pratap
 Vijayashanti
 Nirosha
 Sarath Kumar
 Sudhakar
 Kaikala Satyanarayana
 Brahmanandam
 Kota Srinivasa Rao
 Gollapudi Maruti Rao
 Mohan Raj
 Babu Mohan
 Jyothi

Soundtrack
The following is the track listing.

Awards
 Nirosha won the Nandi Special Jury Award for her performance in this film.

References

External links
 

1991 films
1990s Telugu-language films
Indian action films
1991 action films
Films scored by Ilaiyaraaja
Films based on novels by Yandamuri Veerendranath